The Derbyshire Championships originally known as the Championship of Derbyshire was a men's and women's grass court tennis tournament held at the Buxton Lawn Tennis Club, Buxton, Derbyshire, Great Britain from 1881 to 1953

History
A tennis tournament was originally held at Buxton Garden's as early as 1880. By 1883 the club had attracted more players and a men's championships was staged for the first time which was won by New Zealand player Minden Fenwick, he went on to win the New Zealand Championships three times from (1892-1894). In 1884 the owners of the Buxton Gardens, the Buxton Improvements Company, decided to stage a fully open event featuring men's and women's singles, with ladies' and gentlemen's singles played under the title 'Championship of Derbyshire', and a ladies' doubles played with the imposing title of 'The All-England Ladies Doubles'. The inugural ladies' singles champion was Agnes Noon Watts. This latter championship was the first of its kind, being inaugurated before Wimbledon. The championships were not staged during World War I or World War II. It remained a featured tournament in the annual tennis tours.

Notable winners of the men's singles included Grainger Chaytor (1892–1894, 1899), Wilberforce Eaves (1904), Laurie Doherty (1909), Adrian Quist (1936) and Franjo Kukuljević (1949). Previous women's singles champions included Louisa Martin (1886), Blanche Bingley Hillyard (1906), Elizabeth Ryan (1921) and Gem Hoahing (1948). The Derbyshire Championships ran until 1953 when it was abolished. The final men's singles champion was Nigel Cockburn from South Africa and the final women's singles title went to Britain's Mary Harris.

References

Sources
The History of Tennis in Buxton, Buxton Tennis Club. Buxton. England http://www.buxtontennisclub.co.uk/history.
 Lake, Robert (2015). A social history of tennis in Britain. Milton Park, Abingdon, Oxon: Routledge. ISBN 9781134445578. 
 "Tennis New Zealand 2012: Chapter: National Championships" (PDF). Tennis Kiwi. Tennis New Zealand. Retrieved 4 October 2022. Chapter: National Championships

Grass court tennis tournaments
Defunct tennis tournaments in the United Kingdom
Tennis tournaments in England